William Browne (21 February 1936 – 14 October 2004) was an Irish soccer player during the 1960s.

A Bohemian F.C. legend, he was the last amateur to have been capped for the full Republic of Ireland national team for 43 years until Joseph Lapira was capped against Ecuador in May 2007.

Career 
Born in Longford and educated at St. Mel's College, Browne began his career at UCD, where, as well as winning numerous international university caps, he was a member of 4 winning Collingwood Cup teams, and after graduating, he signed for then strictly amateur Bohemians in time for the 1961/62 season. A strong central defender, he was made captain of Bohemians in only his 2nd season at the club. He was a born leader, so much so that Bohs broke with their tradition of having a different man captain the team each year and Willie kept the captaincy for 3 seasons in a row.

The 1963/64 season was Willie's finest as Bohs reached the semi-final of the FAI Cup and Willie won three full international caps for Ireland. He made his debut away to Austria in a European Nations Cup tie that finished 0–0. He started left back in a 2–0 defeat to Spain and earned his third and final cap at Dalymount Park in a 3–1 defeat to England.

In 1963 he was voted Personality of the Year by the Soccer Writers Association of Ireland and was also awarded the Caltex Award for soccer.

Seán Thomas arrived as manager of Bohs in 1964/65 and turned things around. The perennial strugglers finished third in the league that season with Browne excelling at the back. This was a remarkable achievement for a fully amateur team. Things got better the next season as Bohs once again finished third and ended a 19-year wait for silverware by winning both the LFA President's Cup and the Leinster Senior Cup. This was to be Willie's swansong as he retired from football at the end of the season. He made 177 appearances for Bohs in all competitions scoring 20 goals. Impressively consistent in any defensive position, Browne missed just four league games in his five seasons.

A fine tennis player, he won nine men's open singles tennis championship titles at Elm Park and later became a single handicap golfer at the club.

Willie Browne died in October 2004 .

Honours 
 Leinster Senior Cup
 Bohemians - 1965/66
 LFA President's Cup
 Bohemians - 1965/66
Sports Writers Personality of the Year
 1963

Representative Honours 
 3 Full International Irish caps
 16 Amateur Irish caps
 1 Ireland "B" cap
 6 Inter-League caps

References 

Sportspeople from County Longford
Republic of Ireland association footballers
League of Ireland players
League of Ireland XI players
Bohemian F.C. players
University College Dublin A.F.C. players
Republic of Ireland international footballers
Republic of Ireland B international footballers
2004 deaths
1936 births
Association football defenders